The Bellingham Conglomerate is one of several Pennsylvanian stratigraphic units in eastern Massachusetts. It is mainly conglomerate and greywacke, exclusive to the Bellingham Basin. The conglomerate has granite and quartzite pebbles in a mica matrix, sourced from the neighboring Blackstone Group and Milford Granite (which has locally unique blue quartz). The two main rock types are interbedded with chlorite phyllite which contains minerals such as muscovite, quartz, zoisite, magnetite and chloritoid. 

The formation may be the same age as the Roxbury Conglomerate in the Boston Basin.

Outcrops
The conglomerate outcrops at several different locations. Two notable examples include the intersection of Blackstone Street and River Street in Woonsocket, with green sandstone and conglomerate or cliffs on the side of Woonsocket Hill.

References